3MA may refer to:

 3MA (music group), a musical group with members from Mali, Madagascar and Morocco
 Triple M Sunraysia, an Australian radio station formerly broadcast as 3MA
 DNA-3-methyladenine glycosylase